Athena is a female given name of Greek origin, especially in reference to the Greco-Roman goddess Athena. The name has been among the top 1,000 names for girls in the United States since the mid-1950s and was the 108th most popular name for newborn American girls in 2020. It has been one of the 500 most popular names for girls in England and Wales since 2012 and in France since 2018. It has also been well-used in recent years in Canada, Iceland, and New Zealand. The popularity of mythological names also increased in use for babies born during the COVID-19 pandemic.

People with this given name include:

Persons

Stagenamed "Athena"
 Athena Andreadis, aka Athena, an Anglo-Greek musician
 Athena Tibi, aka Athena, a Filipino singer & actress based in Japan
 Athena (wrestler), ringname of U.S. pro-wrestler Adrienne Reese

Given named "Athena"
 Athena Aktipis, U.S. psychologist
 Athena Andreadis, an Anglo-Greek musician
 Athena Cage (born 1970), U.S. singer
 Athena Chu (born 1971), Hongkong actress
 Athena Coustenis (born 1961), French astrophysicist
 Athena Farrokhzad (born 1983), Iranian Swedish poet-playwright
 Athena Finger, heir to cartoonist Bill Finger, co-creator of Batman
 Athena Marguerite Françoise Marie Glücksburg, Princess Athena of Denmark (born 2012)
 Athena Imperial (born 1987), Filipina journalist
 Athena Karkanis (born 1981), Canadian actress
 Athena Keen, former instructor at the American School of Ballet
 Athena King, former journalist for the Naked News
 Athena Kolbe, U.S. human rights researcher
 Athena LaTocha, Lakota Amerindian artist
 Athena Lee (markswoman), Philippine-American competition shooter
 Athena Lee Atkins Kottak Bass (born 1964), U.S. musician
 Athéna Locatelli (born 1991), French ice hockey player
 Athena Loizides (born 1965), Greek Cypriot TV personality
 Athena Lundberg (born 1986), PMOM January 2006
 Athena McNinch (born 1997), Guamanian-Taiwanese pageant queen
 Athena Manoukian (born 1994), Greek-Armenian singer
 Athena Michailidou (1918-2001), Greek actress
 Athena Papas, U.S. dental scholar
 Athena Reich, Canadian-American actress
 Athena Salman, U.S. politician
 Athena Sefat, U.S. physicist
 Athena Starwoman (1945-2004), Australian psychic
 Athena Tacha (born 1936), Greek artist
 Athena Tibi (born 1988), Filipina singer and actress based in Japan
 Athena Xenidou, Cypriot writer-director
 Athena Lee Yen (born 1981), Taiwanese actress
Athina Markopoulou, Greek-American engineer

Mythological
 Athena, Greco-Roman goddess
 Minerva, Roman equivalent, sometimes called Athena
 Pallas Athena, aspect
 Athena Alea, Greek aspect
 Athena Areia, Greek aspect
 Athena Alkidemos, Greek aspect

Fictional characters
 Athena, a mascot for the 2004 Summer Olympics, one of the trio of Athena, Phevos and Proteas
 Athena (DC Comics), a DC Comics character and member of the Olympian Gods
 Athena (Marvel Comics), a Marvel Comics character and member of the Olympian Gods
 Thena, another Marvel Comics character who has gone by the name Athena, a member of the Eternals
 Athena, an Image Comics character, Lily Nalin, and member of Bloodstrike
 Athena, an owl character from the Rainbow Butterfly Unicorn Kitty TV series
 Athena (The Little Mermaid), Princess Ariel's mother in the Disney franchise
 Athena, a Marvel UK character and member of the Warheads
 Princess Athena, main character of the 1986 SNK video game Athena
 Athena Asamiya, a character in the video game Psycho Soldier and The King of Fighters series, described as a descendant of Princess Athena of the 1986 video game Athena
 Athena, the first opponent of Godou Kusanagi in the manga/anime Campione!
 "Athena", a codename for character Dana Mercer, a sister of protagonist of [PROTOTYPE]
 Athena (Stargate), a Goa'uld in the TV series Stargate SG-1
Athena the Gladiator, an important character from the Borderlands video game series
Lieutenant Athena, a bridge officer in the 1978–79 television series Battlestar Galactica
Number Eight (Battlestar Galactica), a Humanoid Cylon, with multiple copies, in the 2004 reboot of Battlestar Galactica, one of whom is Sharon "Athena" Agathon.
 Athena, an important character in the Sony PlayStation 2 game God of War
 Athena Cykes, a defense attorney from the Ace Attorney franchise
 Athena Glory, a character from the animanga Aria
 Athena Grant, LAPD sergeant on the TV series 9-1-1
 Athena Morrow, a character on the TV series Hvmans
 Athena Tennousu, a character in the manga/anime Hayate the Combat Butler and the eponymous protagonist's first true love

Notes

See also

 Athena (disambiguation)
 
 

Feminine given names
Greek feminine given names